Samuel Okyere (born 21 April 1991) is a Ghanaian television personality active in South Korea and Ghana.

Early life
He was accepted into the Korean Government Scholarship Program in 2009 and moved to Korea to study computer science and engineering at Sogang University, in Seoul. Okyere is fluent in the Ashanti Twi dialect of the Ghanaian Akan language; Korean, English, French and Swahili.

Career
He was a cast member in the JTBC talk show Non-Summit. He was listed in Forbes 30 Under 30 Asia in 2017.

Controversy
Sam Okyere took to his Instagram in early August 2020 to condemn the use of Blackface in a graduation photo by a student from a high school in South Korea. His post was quickly met with criticism and caused controversy for his reproaching the use of the derogatory theatrical make-up formally used to caricature and play on the racial stereotypes of Black people.

Controversy was raised for his highlighting the issue where he was accused of openly criticising the incident in an ill-natured way, as well as failing to ask for permission to re-post the image on his Instagram. He has since deleted the post and apologised for the post.

Okyere has since spoken after this issue in a BBC News podcast, wishing to highlight and create conversation to better gather understanding in regards to racial social issues. He has previously spoken on the issue of blackface used in the entertainment industry.

New backlash has arisen following a comment made on a photo of himself and actress Park Eun-hye in March 2019 by replying to a comment that was deemed suggestive.

Okyere has deleted his Instagram account due to additional backlash for the comment.

Filmography

Variety shows

TV series

Film

Awards and nominations

References

1991 births
Living people
Ghanaian Christians
Ghanaian television personalities
Ghanaian expatriates in South Korea
Sogang University alumni
People from Accra